"Testimony of Evil (Dead Men Don't Laugh)" is the sixth and final episode of the short-lived TV series Police Squad!. The episode was directed by Joe Dante and written by Tino Insana and Robert Wuhl. The episode was produced by Robert K. Weiss.

Plot
A struggling comedian (played by William Conrad) owes money to the owner of a nightclub. When his body is discovered at the bottom of a cliff in a car crash, all the clues point to suicide. It's later discovered that the comedian was also a police informant on a drug ring he infiltrated at his nightclub. Frank (Leslie Nielsen) steps in and takes the place of the deceased at the nightclub in order to gather more clues.

Recurring jokes
Tonight's special guest star: William Conrad, who (like Lorne Greene in the first episode) portrays a man who is thrown out of a moving car with a knife in his chest.
Next week's experiment: Why cows look forward to giving milk.
Johnny's next customer: Dick Clark, who portrays a man who initially wants help understanding a new type of music (ska) before asking for some "secret formula youth cream".
Freeze frame gag: The office falls apart around Frank, Ed, and Norberg.

References

External links

 

Police Squad! episodes
1982 American television episodes
American television series finales